Espoo Rugby Club is a Finnish rugby club in Espoo.

History
The club was founded in autumn 2013 and debuted in the Finnish Championship League in 2014. The club was relegated from the Finnish Championship League in 2016 and has been playing in the Finnish 1st division since then.

References

External links
Espoo RC

Finnish rugby union teams
Rugby clubs established in 2013
2013 establishments in Finland
Sport in Espoo